Borrelia spielmanii is a spirochete bacterium; it routinely infects Ixodes ricinus, and subsequently humans, causing Lyme disease.

References

Further reading

External links
NCBI Taxonomy Browser - Borrelia

spielmanii
Bacteria described in 2006